Constance Prem Nath Dass (1886 – 1971) was an Indian educator and college administrator. She was president of Isabella Thoburn College (IT College), a women's college in Lucknow, which made her the first Indian woman to serve as the principal of a Christian college in India.

Early life and education 
Constance Prem Nath Dass was born in 1886 to a prominent Punjabi second generation-Presbyterian family from Firozpur, then in north west India. Her father sent her older sisters, including Mohini Maya Das, to America and Edinburgh to have a western education but chose to have Dass educated in her home before attending schools in Lahore and later, in 1904, at Isabella Thoburn College. While at IT College, she met John Goucher who paid for her to study at Goucher College from 1909 to 1911. From Goucher, she earned a Bachelor of Arts she graduated Phi Beta Kappa. She returned to Isabella Thoburn College where she taught and later earned a Master of Arts in English literature from the University of Allahabad.

Career 
In 1931, Dass became the vice principal of Thoburn College. While on a sabbatical between 1938 and 1939, she earned a master's degree, Phi Beta Kappa, in education from Columbia Teacher's College. Dass was appointed as the president of the college upon return, becoming the first Indian woman to serve as the principal of a Christian College in India. She retired in 1945. In 1946, she gave the commencement address at the invitation of Goucher College. She then went to Ontario for a peace conference organized by John Mott for war refugees. She remained closely associated with IT College throughout her retirement, including serving on its Board of Governors until her death.

Awards and honors 
Dass was awarded honorary doctorates from Goucher College and Boston University. She is the subject of the biography Constance Prem Nath Dass: An Extraordinary History, 1886–1971, co-written by her granddaughter, Amrita Dass and Nina David.

Personal life 
While studying at IT College, she met her future husband Prem Nath Dass who proposed to her in 1906. She told him that she wanted to study in America, so he waited for her to return. Dass married Prem Nath Dass who was from a prominent Christian family in the United Provinces. They had six children between the years 1915 and 1924. She was a nationalist and a political moderate. Her husband died in 1931. Dass died in 1971.

References 

1886 births
1971 deaths
Goucher College alumni
University of Allahabad alumni
Teachers College, Columbia University alumni
Punjabi academics
Indian women academics
Isabella Thoburn College alumni
19th-century Indian women
19th-century Indian people
20th-century Indian women
20th-century Indian people